The 95th New York State Legislature, consisting of the New York State Senate and the New York State Assembly, met from January 2 to May 14, 1872, during the fourth year of John T. Hoffman's governorship, in Albany.

Background
Under the provisions of the New York Constitution of 1846, 32 Senators and 128 assemblymen were elected in single-seat districts; senators for a two-year term, assemblymen for a one-year term. The senatorial districts were made up of entire counties, except New York County (five districts) and Kings County (two districts). The Assembly districts were made up of entire towns, or city wards, forming a contiguous area, all within the same county.

At this time there were two major political parties: the Republican Party and the Democratic Party.

Elections
The 1871 New York state election was held on November 7. All seven statewide elective offices up for election were carried by the Republicans. The approximate party strength at this election, as expressed by the vote for Secretary of State, was: Republicans 387,000 and Democrats 368,000.

Sessions
The Legislature met for the regular session at the Old State Capitol in Albany on January 2, 1872; and adjourned on May 14.

Henry Smith (R) was elected Speaker with 95 votes against 26 for John C. Jacobs (D).

In his annual message to the Legislature, Gov. John T. Hoffman suggested that a bi-partisan Constitutional Commission of 32 members should be formed. The Commission had four members from each judicial district, appointed by the Governor, and confirmed by the State Senate, equally divided between Democrats and Republicans.

William B. Woodin (R) was elected President pro tempore of the State Senate.

On May 1, Supreme Court Justice Albert Cardozo tendered his resignation, just before the report of the Judiciary Committee of the Assembly, which proposed his impeachment, was read. No further action was taken against Cardozo.

On May 2, the Assembly impeached Supreme Court Justice George G. Barnard.

On May 23, the Senate set the opening of the trial of Judge John McCunn, of the New York City Marine Court, for June 18.

On June 18, the Senate met for the trials of Judge McCunn, and Chenango County Judge Horace G. Prindle.

On July 2, the Senate removed Judge McCunn from office.

On July 17, the New York Court for the Trial of Impeachments met at Saratoga Springs to open the trial of Justice Barnard.

On August 19, Barnard was convicted by the Impeachment Court, was removed from office, and barred from ever holding public office again.

On December 4, the Constitutional Commission met.

State Senate

Districts

 1st District: Queens, Richmond and Suffolk counties
 2nd District: 1st, 2nd, 3rd, 4th, 5th, 7th, 11th, 13th, 15th, 19th and 20th wards of the City of Brooklyn
 3rd District: 6th, 8th, 9th, 10th, 12th, 14th, 16th, 17th and 18th wards of the City of Brooklyn; and all towns in Kings County
 4th District: 1st, 2nd, 3rd, 4th, 5th, 6th, 7th, 13th and 14th wards of New York City
 5th District: 8th, 9th, 15th and 16th wards of New York City
 6th District: 10th, 11th and 17th wards of New York City
 7th District: 18th, 20th and 21st wards of New York City
 8th District: 12th, 19th and 22nd wards of New York City
 9th District: Putnam, Rockland and Westchester counties
 10th District: Orange and Sullivan counties
 11th District: Columbia and Dutchess counties
 12th District: Rensselaer and Washington counties
 13th District: Albany County
 14th District: Greene and Ulster counties
 15th District: Fulton, Hamilton, Montgomery, Saratoga and Schenectady counties
 16th District: Clinton, Essex and Warren counties
 17th District: Franklin and St. Lawrence counties
 18th District: Jefferson and Lewis counties
 19th District: Oneida County
 20th District: Herkimer and Otsego counties
 21st District: Madison and Oswego counties
 22nd District: Onondaga and Cortland counties
 23rd District: Chenango, Delaware and Schoharie counties
 24th District: Broome, Tompkins and Tioga counties
 25th District: Cayuga and Wayne counties
 26th District: Ontario, Seneca and Yates counties
 27th District: Chemung, Schuyler and Steuben counties
 28th District: Monroe County
 29th District: Genesee, Niagara and Orleans counties
 30th District: Allegany, Livingston and Wyoming counties
 31st District: Erie County
 32nd District: Cattaraugus and Chautauqua counties

Note: There are now 62 counties in the State of New York. The counties which are not mentioned in this list had not yet been established, or sufficiently organized, the area being included in one or more of the abovementioned counties.

Members
The asterisk (*) denotes members of the previous Legislature who continued in office as members of this Legislature. Isaac V. Baker Jr., Webster Wagner and James H. Graham changed from the Assembly to the Senate.

Employees
 Clerk: James Terwilliger, resigned February 14
Charles R. Dayton, from February 17
 Sergeant-at-Arms: Edwin J. Loomis
 Doorkeeper: Daniel K. Schram
 Assistant Doorkeeper: J. D. Lonergan
 Journal Clerk: Charles R. Dayton, until February 17

State Assembly

Assemblymen
The asterisk (*) denotes members of the previous Legislature who continued as members of this Legislature.

Party affiliations follow the vote for Speaker.

Employees
 Clerk: Cornelius S. Underwood, died on April 27, 1872
Edward M. Johnson, from May 1, 1872
 Sergeant-at-Arms: Philip J. Rhinehardt
 Doorkeeper: Eugene L. Demers
 First Assistant Doorkeeper: James H. Lee
 Second Assistant Doorkeeper: James Hogan

Notes

Sources
 Civil List and Constitutional History of the Colony and State of New York compiled by Edgar Albert Werner (1884; see pg. 276 for Senate districts; pg. 290 for senators; pg. 298–304 for Assembly districts; and pg. 372f for assemblymen)
 Journal of the Assembly (95th Session) (1872, Vol. I, January 2 to April 9, 1872) 
 Journal of the Assembly (95th Session) (1872, Vol. II, April 9 to May 14, 1872) 
 Senators Elected and Assemblymen Elected in Corning Journal on November 16, 1871
 THE ASSEMBLY in NYT on December 1, 1871
 THE REFORM LEGISLATURE in NYT on January 3, 1872

095
1872 in New York (state)
1872 U.S. legislative sessions